"A Toy for Juliette" is a 1967 science fiction and horror short story by American writer Robert Bloch, appearing for the first time in Harlan Ellison's anthology Dangerous Visions.

Plot
In a post-apocalyptic world, a time traveler randomly abducts people from throughout history for his granddaughter Juliette (named for the Marquis de Sade's novel Juliette) to torture and kill in her sexual games. The last "toy" he gives her, however, turns out to be Jack the Ripper.

Reception
SFF World has called it "unsettling".

Sequel
Ellison wrote a sequel for the same anthology called "The Prowler in the City at the Edge of the World".

See also 
 Jack the Ripper
 Jack the Ripper in fiction
 Juliette (novel)
 Marquis de Sade

References

External links 

1967 short stories
Horror short stories
Literature about time travel
Science fiction short stories
Cultural depictions of Jack the Ripper
Dangerous Visions short stories
Short stories by Robert Bloch